iMedix was a health search engine and social network service that utilized advanced proprietary algorithms to provide information in response to medical questions and concerns. iMedix was a U.S. cooperation founded in 2006 by Amir Leitersdorf and Iri Amirav. The company's R&D was based in Herzeliya, Israel.

Om May 18, 2011, AVG Technologies acquired iMedix Web Technologies Ltd., realizing "the integration of iMedix software with the Company’s existing solutions." The website shut down sometime after February 2012.

Service and technology
The iMedix service offered a combination of a health search engine and a collaborative community platform.

Reception
iMedix was one of PCWorld'''s 100 Incredibly Useful and Interesting Web Sites'' in 2008.

References

External links
 iMedix
 iMedix on Techcrunch

American medical websites
Defunct social networking services
Online support groups